Cowdenbeath railway station is a railway station in the town of Cowdenbeath, Fife, Scotland.

The station can be accessed via two steep ramps from either the east side of the High Street, or Station Road, and there is a footbridge connecting the platforms.

The ticket office is situated within the waiting room. Additional ticket facilities are provided by an automatic ticket machine outside the waiting room. There is a toilet but to access it, a key must be obtained from the ticket office. There were public toilet facilities in the High Street but these were closed in May 2008; now the nearest facilities are at Cowdenbeath Leisure Centre, a short walk from the High Street.

The nearest bus stops, public phones and taxi rank are in the High Street.

History

The Edinburgh and Northern Railway was the first company to serve Cowdenbeath from 1848, with the Kinross-shire Railway line to Kinross opening 12 years later in 1860 (this later became part of the most direct rail route between Edinburgh and ).  This though followed a more southerly course through the town than the present alignment, which was built & commissioned by the North British Railway in June 1890 as part of the programme of works associated with the new Forth Rail Bridge.  The station here was opened on this date, with the original depot becoming Cowdenbeath Old.  A connecting chord was subsequently built to link the 'New' station to the 1848 E&NR route and from March 1919, all passenger services were routed this way. The 1848 station & line serving it was then closed to passengers, although it remained open for through goods traffic until 1966 and to serve a colliery at the western end until 1978.

The opening of the Dunfermline and Queensferry Railway in 1877 and the Glenfarg Line linking Kinross with  meant that the new station was served from the outset by main line expresses between Edinburgh and Perth (some of which continued on to  via the Highland Main Line) as well as local trains toward Stirling (via Alloa) & Thornton Junction along the old E&NR route via Cardenden from 1919.  All the routes in the area became part of the London and North Eastern Railway at the 1923 Grouping and the Scottish Region of British Railways upon nationalisation of the railway network in January 1948.

The station was not listed for closure in the 1963 Beeching Report, but it lost many of its services in the years that followed - trains to the coast were withdrawn beyond  in October 1969, whilst the Kinross and Perth line was closed to all traffic just a few months later (on 5 January 1970) leaving only the route to Dunfermline & Edinburgh in operation. Cowdenbeath thereafter became the terminus for most trains, with only a limited number of peak period services continuing through to Cardenden.  This remained the situation until the line beyond there to Thornton Junction was reopened and the Fife Circle Line service introduced in 1989.

Services 
Monday to Saturday daytimes there is generally a half-hourly service southbound to Edinburgh and an hourly service northbound towards  (and back to Edinburgh) on the Fife Circle Line. Although some services now terminate at Cowdenbeath then return on the Edinburgh - Bound Track after turning at points located approximately 1/4 Mile south of the station. 

In the evenings and on Sundays there is an hourly service in each direction.

References

External links 

Railway stations in Fife
Former North British Railway stations
Railway stations in Great Britain opened in 1890
Railway stations served by ScotRail
Cowdenbeath
1890 establishments in Scotland